Ole Johnson (February 23, 1838 - November 4, 1886) was a Norwegian-American soldier in the American Civil War who served with the Scandinavian Regiment.

Background
Ole Johnson was born on the Skipnes Farm, (Skibsnes), near Nordsjø, in Helgen Parish, Telemark, Norway. He came to the United States with his parents and four siblings, arriving in New York on board the Salvator,  on July 6, 1844.  The family went to Whitewater, Walworth County, Wisconsin. In 1852, they moved to Koshkonong, Wisconsin. Johnson studied law at Beloit College.  He became a school teacher in Stoughton.

Civil War
When the Civil War broke out, Johnson joined the Scandinavian Regiment (15th Wisconsin Volunteer Regiment) and was appointed captain of Company B. After the battle at Perryville, Johnson was promoted to the rank of major. He took part in the battle of Murfreesboro and reached the rank of lieutenant colonel in March 1863. The Scandavian Regiment was heavily mauled at the battle of Chickamauga with approximately 63% killed, wounded or captured. Colonel Hans Christian Heg who had commanded the Regiment since its formation was killed and Johnson was captured.

Johnson was held in Libby Prison in Virginia before it was decided in May 1864 to move him to another prison. At Chesterville, Johnson and two others escaped from the railroad car they were being transported in. After a month, the men were able to rejoin the Union Army at Strawberry Plains, Tennessee. Johnson was promoted to colonel and took command of the Scandinavian Regiment on July 24, 1864, remaining with the regiment until the end of the war.

Post Civil War
After the war Johnson went into business and settled in Beloit, Rock County, Wisconsin, becoming active in the Republican Party and was elected mayor of Beloit. Johnson was appointed Immigration Commissioner of the state of Wisconsin. Later he became president of the Watertown Bank.

Johnson married on January 3, 1867 to Caroline Freie Bödtker. They had one child, a son, named Wilfor Chickamauga Shipness. In his later years, Johnson had adopted the last name "Skipnes", the name of his family farm in Norway. Ole Johnson died in Beloit, Wisconsin.

References

External links
15th Wisconsin Infantry Regiment
Wisconsin Board of Immigration
Norske Gaardnavne (v.7, p. 174 Bratsberg Amt by O. Rygh with A. Kjær. 1914)

1838 births
1886 deaths
People from Telemark
Mayors of places in Wisconsin
People from Beloit, Wisconsin
American Civil War prisoners of war
United States Army officers
People of Wisconsin in the American Civil War
Norwegian emigrants to the United States
Beloit College alumni
Union Army colonels
19th-century American politicians
People from Koshkonong, Wisconsin